Shoaib Khan (born 27 July 1978) is a Pakistani cricketer. He has played more than 140 first-class and 80 List A matches since 1999. In the 2003–04 Quaid-e-Azam Trophy, Khan scored 300 not out batting for Peshawar against Quetta.

References

External links
 

1978 births
Living people
Pakistani cricketers
Baluchistan cricketers
Pakistan International Airlines cricketers
Peshawar cricketers
Water and Power Development Authority cricketers
Cricketers from Peshawar